Man Mo Temple or Man Mo Miu is a temple for the worship of the Civil or Literature God Man Tai / Man Cheong and the Martial God Mo Tai / Kwan Tai. The two Deities were popularly patronized by scholars and students seeking progress in their study or ranking in the civil examinations in the Ming and Qing dynasties. There are several Man Mo temples in Hong Kong, the best known of which is the temple in Sheung Wan.

Sheung Wan

The largest Man Mo Temple in Hong Kong is on 124–126 Hollywood Road, in Sheung Wan. It was built in 1847. It is part of a complex that comprises three adjacent blocks: Man Mo Temple, Lit Shing Temple (No. 128 Hollywood Road), and Kung So.

The Man Mo Temple, the main building of the complex, is dedicated to the civil god Man Cheong and the martial god Kwan Tai. Lit Shing Kung is for the worship of all heavenly gods. Kung So, to its west, was an assembly hall where community affairs and disputes were settled.

In 1908, the temple was officially entrusted to Tung Wah Board of Directors. The temple has since been managed by the Tung Wah Group of Hospitals. It was graded as a Grade I historic building in 1993 and it is now a declared monument.

It is open from 8:00am to 6:00pm daily.

Tai Po

The Man Mo Temple in Fu Shin Street, Tai Po, was built in 1893 to mark the founding of Tai Wo Shi (Tai Wo Market Town, now commonly known as Tai Po Market). It has been listed as a declared monument of Hong Kong.

Lantau

At Pak Ngan Heung, in Mui Wo, Lantau Island, this Man Mo Temple underwent a major renovation in 1960 and was rebuilt in 2001. It is not graded.

In popular culture
The Hollywood Road temple made an appearance in the video game Shenmue II for the Dreamcast and Xbox consoles. The temple and its grounds can be explored. However, its location in the video game is different from its actual place. The temple also appeared in the series' anime adaptation.

See also
 Martial temple
 Wen Wu temple for similar temples in other locations
 Hip Tin temples in Hong Kong
 Kwan Tai temples in Hong Kong
 Tin Hau temples in Hong Kong

References

External links

Man Mo Temple, Sheung Wan
 Man Mo Temple Compound 124-126, 128 and 130 Hollywood Road, Sheung Wan
 Photo gallery featuring views of the interior of the Man Mo Temple on Hollywood Road
Man Mo Temple, Tai Po
 Virtual visit of the Man Mo Temple, Tai Po 
Man Mo Temple, Lantau
 Antiquities and Monuments Office. Description, pictures

Declared monuments of Hong Kong
Guandi temples
Sheung Wan
Taoist temples in Hong Kong